Caché, also known as Hidden, is a 2005 psychological thriller film written and directed by Michael Haneke and starring Daniel Auteuil, Juliette Binoche and Maurice Bénichou. The plot follows an upper-class French couple, Georges (Auteuil) and Anne (Binoche), who are terrorised by anonymous tapes that appear on their front porch and seem to show the family is under surveillance. Shot in Paris and Vienna in 2004, the film is a co-production of France, Austria, Germany and Italy. The French government's decades-long denial of the 1961 Seine River massacre was an inspiration to the story.

Caché competed for the Palme d'Or at the 2005 Cannes Film Festival, where polled critics and festival audiences considered it a frontrunner. Ultimately, the jury awarded Haneke Best Director. At the European Film Awards, it competed with the Cannes Palme d'Or winner, L'Enfant by the Dardenne brothers, with Caché winning five awards, including Best Film.

The film was submitted as Austria's entry for the Academy Award for Best Foreign Language Film at the 78th Academy Awards, but was disqualified as French is not predominantly the language of Austria. As Haneke is Austrian, it would have also been disqualified if France or any other country had submitted it. The exclusion sparked criticism, with Sony Pictures Classics co-president Michael Barker calling it "unfortunate" and saying the story demanded the film be in French. Austria's Fachverband der Audiovisions und Filmindustrie protested the criteria, and Haneke, whose previous French-language The Piano Teacher was not disqualified as the Austrian submission, also called the rules "really stupid". Academy member Mark Johnson responded, "We're in the process right now of considering some very radical changes".

Accolades

References

External links 
 

Lists of accolades by film